Yu-Ching Lin (born December 29, 1988) is a former Taiwanese baseball player who had played for the Brother Elephants, Chinatrust Brothers, Fubon Guardians and Uni-President 7-Eleven Lions in the Chinese Professional Baseball League.

He attended National Taiwan University of Physical Education and Sport and represented Taiwan at the 2009 World Port Tournament, 2009 Asian Baseball Championship, 2009 Baseball World Cup, 2011 Baseball World Cup and 2013 World Baseball Classic.

In January 2021, he made statement of retirement, ending 9-year player career.

External links 
 Baseball America

1988 births
Living people
Baseball pitchers
Brother Elephants players
CTBC Brothers players
Fubon Guardians players
People from Chiayi
Taiwanese baseball players
2013 World Baseball Classic players